James McInnes (19 May 1901 – 14 April 1974) was a Scottish politician.

Born in Newry, McInnes was educated at Glasgow Secondary School, and then became a railway clerk.  He joined the Labour Party, serving on Glasgow Town Council from 1933 until 1950, and was leader of the Labour group on the council for his final year.  In 1938, he chaired the Scottish Council of the Labour Party.

McInnes stood unsuccessfully in Glasgow Pollok at the 1935 United Kingdom general election, and then in Glasgow Central at the 1945 United Kingdom general election.  He won the seat at the 1950 United Kingdom general election, serving until his retirement in 1966.

References

External links 

1901 births
1974 deaths
Labour Party (UK) MPs for English constituencies
Members of the Parliament of the United Kingdom for Glasgow constituencies
UK MPs 1950–1951
UK MPs 1951–1955
UK MPs 1955–1959
UK MPs 1959–1964
UK MPs 1964–1966